"Oh Digga" is a song by Swiss rapper Loredana and Kosovo-Albanian rapper Mozzik from their first collaborative studio album, No Rich Parents (2021). It was independently released as the record's second single for digital download and streaming on 25 June 2021. It was written by Loredana, Mozzik, Alexander Wagner, Jumpa and Smajl Shaqiri, with the production by Loredana, Mozzik and Jumpa. "Oh Digga" is a German-language hip hop song, which lyrically talks about the rapper's being tired by envious and toxic people. Music critics particularly praised the song's nature. An accompanying music video was uploaded to Loredana's YouTube channel on 25 June 2021. It depicts Loredana and Mozzik with several imitations of themselves throughout the clip. Commercially, "Oh Digga" reached the top 10 in Albania and peaking at number 44 in Austria, as well as number 27 in Germany and Switzerland, respectively.

Background and composition 

Loredana and Mozzik confirmed their first collaborative studio album, No Rich Parents, in May 2021. "Oh Digga" was independently released as the record's second single under exclusive license to Groove Attack in various countries on 25 June 2021. It was written by Loredana, Mozzik, Alexander Wagner, Jumpa and Smajl Shaqiri, with the production by Loredana, Mozzik and Jumpa. It is a German-language hip hop song, which talks about the rapper's being tired by envious and toxic people.

Reception and music video 

Upon its release, "Oh Digga" received positive reviews from music critics. Lea Hohneck from rap.de predicted a success in part to the track's "expressive" beat, its "punchlines" and "side cuts". Raphael from VN Hip Hop was similarly positive and wrote that it is a "addictive jam". "Oh Digga" experienced commercial success in Albania and German-speaking Europe. It peaked at number six in Albania and reached number 44 in Austria, as well as number 27 in Germany and Switzerland, respectively. An accompanying music video for "Oh Digga" was uploaded to Loredana's official YouTube channel simultaneously with the single's release on 25 June 2021. It was directed and produced by Fati.Tv and Haris Dubica, while Dieser Bobby acted as the creative director. In the clip, the rappers are predominantly seen with several imitations of themselves, trying to represent the rapper's originality.

Track listing 

Digital download and streaming
"Oh Digga"2:26

Credits and personnel 
Credits adapted from Spotify and Tidal.

Loredanaproducing, songwriting, vocals
Mozzik (Gramoz Aliu)producing, songwriting, vocals
Jumpasongwriting, producing
Alexander Wagnersongwriting
Koen Heldensmixing, mastering

Charts

Release history

References 

2021 singles
2021 songs
Loredana Zefi songs
Mozzik songs
Music videos directed by Fati.tv
German-language songs
Song recordings produced by Jumpa
Songs written by Loredana Zefi